Ava Markham (born December 29, 1999) is an American tennis player.

Raised in Demarest, New Jersey, Markham attended Northern Valley Regional High School at Demarest.

Markham has a career-high doubles ranking by the WTA of 617, achieved on July 25, 2022.

Markham won her biggest title to date at the 2022 The Women's Hospital Classic, where she partnered Kolie Allen to win the doubles title.

ITF Circuit finals

Singles

Doubles: 1 (1 title)

References

External links
 
 
 Ava Markham at the University of Wisconsin–Madison

1999 births
Living people
American female tennis players
Northern Valley Regional High School at Demarest alumni
People from Demarest, New Jersey
Sportspeople from Bergen County, New Jersey
Tennis people from New Jersey
Wisconsin Badgers women's tennis players